The Hunters Lullaby is the first solo album released by Canadian musician Raine Maida, the vocalist for Our Lady Peace. It was released on November 13, 2007, by Kingnoise Records. The first single off the album is "Yellow Brick Road". Previous solo work by Maida includes a four-song EP entitled Love Hope Hero, which was released on November 14.

Track listing
Careful What You Wish For – 4:40 (composed by  Chantal Kreviazuk)
Sex Love and Honey – 4:03
Yellow Brick Road – 3:07
The Less I Know (feat. Jared Paul) – 3:40
Earthless – 3:00
The Snake and the Crown – 2:41 (composed by – Jared Paul)
Confessional – 3:06
China Doll – 3:31
Rat Race – 3:41
One Second Chance – 3:01

Bonus tracks

 Victim of a Small Town (iTunes pre-order) – 3:01
 21st Century Blues (iTunes pre-order) – 3:35

External links
Raine Maida's official website

2007 albums
Raine Maida albums
Albums produced by Raine Maida